The Green Fog is an experimental film directed by Guy Maddin, Evan Johnson and Galen Johnson, that loosely revisits the plot of Alfred Hitchcock's movie Vertigo through a collage of found footage repurposed from old movies and television shows set in San Francisco. The film was commissioned by the San Francisco Film Society for the 60th San Francisco International Film Festival’s and premiered at the festival's close on April 16, 2017. It then entered limited release on January 5, 2018 and began to tour international festivals. The film features an original score by composer Jacob Garchik and Kronos Quartet.

Festivals
The Green Fog was selected to screen at the following film festivals:

 2017 San Francisco International Film Festival
 2018 Berlin International Film Festival
 2018 Hong Kong International Film Festival
 2018 France's Cinéma du Réel festival
 2018 Buenos Aires International Festival of Independent Cinema
 2018 Las Palmas de Gran Canaria Festival Internacional De Cine
 2018 South Korea's Jeonju International Film Festival
 2018 Ukraine's Molodist International Film Festival
 2018 New Zealand International Film Festival
 2018 Greece's Thessaloniki International Film Festival
 2018 BFI London Film Festival

Awards
The Green Fog was nominated for the C.I.C.A.E. Award at the Berlin International Film Festival in 2018, and has won the following awards:

 2018 Golden Lady Harimaguada (Best Film), Las Palmas de Gran Canaria Festival Internacional De Cine
 2018—Los Angeles Film Critics Association Awards, The Douglas Edwards Experimental Film Award

Critical reception
The film received overwhelmingly positive reviews, with review aggregator Rotten Tomatoes reporting a 95% approval score from critics based on 22 reviews. Metacritic, which assigns a weighted average score out of 100 to reviews from film critics, posts a rating score of 78 based on 10 reviews.

While the film has not received any negative reviews, New York Times critic Ben Kenigsberg, noted Maddin's "slight arrogance in presuming that one of the greatest films of all time [Hitchcock's Vertigo ...] could be approximated, even a little, using clips from lesser directors" but also notes that "if trying to recreate a lost object of obsession from the materials at hand was Hitchcock’s subject, then he couldn’t ask for a more fitting tribute" and calls the movie " a marvel of film scholarship."

Ty Burr, writing for the Boston Globe, called the film "eerie, witty, and unexpectedly moving" and compared it to Christian Marclay's installation film The Clock. Critics also noted that, in addition to serving as a tribute to Hitchcock's Vertigo and a method of deconstructing its own self-critical aspects (which Maddin has discussed in interviews), the film pays homage to the city of San Francisco and its stature in film history, serving as "a scrambled history of San Francisco told through moving pictures."

References

External links
 
 
 

English-language Canadian films
Films directed by Guy Maddin
Films shot in Winnipeg
2017 films
2010s English-language films
2010s Canadian films
Canadian avant-garde and experimental films